Chabahar suicide bombing refers to:
 2010 Chabahar suicide bombing
 2018 Chabahar suicide bombing